Quick response team (QRT) may refer to:

 Police tactical unit (PTU), also called quick response team
 Anne Arundel County Police Department Quick Response Team
 Quick Response Team of the Maharashtra Police
 Mumbai Police Quick Response Team
 Quick Response Team of the Pune Police
 Counter-terrorism response unit
 SOBR: the Special Unit of Quick Response, a spetsnaz unit of the National Guard of Russia
 Rapid reaction force teams from the military
 Drug abuse response team (DART), also called quick response team
 Rapid response team (medicine)
 News TV Quick Response Team, a Philippine television news broadcasting show broadcast by GMA

See also